Guadalupe station is an elevated Manila Metro Rail Transit (MRT) station situated on Line 3. It is located in Makati, Philippines and is named because of its location between the barangays of Guadalupe Nuevo and Guadalupe Viejo, both are in turn named after Our Lady of Guadalupe.

The station is the ninth station for trains headed to Taft Avenue and the fifth station for trains headed to North Avenue. It is the last station of the line south of the Pasig River.

Nearby landmarks
Guadalupe station is near two major seminaries: the San Carlos Seminary and the Our Lady of Guadalupe Minor Seminary, both of which are staffed by the Roman Catholic Archdiocese of Manila. It is also near Guadalupe Commercial Complex, a shopping complex and public market connected to the station's concourse by an elevated walkway. Other nearby landmarks include the centuries-old Nuestra Señora de Gracia Church, Guadalupe Nuevo Cloverleaf Park, Hotel Sogo, and Loyola Memorial Chapels & Crematorium. The Makati City Hall and University of Makati are also accessible via J. P. Rizal Avenue. Guadalupe station is also the nearest station to the Rockwell Center, home to the Power Plant Mall.

Transportation links
Passengers can board jeepneys, taxis, buses, and UV Express to various points from the station, including western Makati, Makati Central Business District, Taguig passing through Bonifacio Global City, Pasay, Pasig, Pateros, and southern Manila. Tricycles can be found in areas further away from EDSA that serve locally within Guadalupe. The Guadalupe Pasig River Ferry Station is also located nearby along J.P. Rizal Avenue. An EDSA Carousel station is located on the nearby Guadalupe Bridge and is accessible through the MRT station. A portion of the southbound platform of the station leading to the emergency stairs is utilized as an access point to the EDSA Carousel station.

The station will be adjacent to the upcoming SkyTrain, built by Alliance Global, that will run from this station to Uptown Bonifacio in the northern side of Bonifacio Global City. It will also be connected to the future Guadalupe Station of the planned Makati Intra-city Subway.

See also
List of rail transit stations in Metro Manila
Manila Metro Rail Transit System Line 3
Guadalupe Bridge

References

External links

The Metrostar Express

Manila Metro Rail Transit System stations
Railway stations opened in 1999
Buildings and structures in Makati
1999 establishments in the Philippines